William Baker (1668 – 4 December 1732) was an English churchman and academic, Warden of Wadham College, Oxford, Bishop of Bangor and bishop of Norwich.

Life
He was the son of William Baker, vicar of Ilton, Somerset, where he was born. He was educated at Crewkerne School, and entered Wadham College, Oxford, where he was first fellow, and eventually became warden in 1719. He was successively rector of St. Ebbes, of Padworth, and of Blaydon, all in the diocese of Oxford. In 1714 he was collated to the archdeaconry of Oxford.

He was chaplain in ordinary to George I. In 1723 he was promoted to the see of Bangor, from which in 1727 he was translated to Norwich. He held the rectory of St. Giles-in-the-Fields in commendam up to the time of his death, which occurred at Bath, 4 December 1732. He never married. During his brief tenure of the see of Bangor he made his only brother treasurer of the church there, and his two nephews were provided for by being made registrars of the diocese of Norwich. Francis Blomefield, the historian of Norfolk, who was ordained by him, gives the titles of four sermons which he printed; one of them was published by special command of Queen Anne in 1710.

References

Attribution

1668 births
1732 deaths
Wardens of Wadham College, Oxford
Bishops of Bangor
Bishops of Norwich
18th-century Church of England bishops
18th-century Welsh Anglican bishops